The Communauté d'agglomération de Saint-Dié-des-Vosges is an administrative association of communes in the Vosges and Meurthe-et-Moselle departments of eastern France. It was created on 1 January 2017 by the merger of the former Communauté de communes de Saint-Dié-des-Vosges, Communauté de communes de la Vallée de la Plaine, Communauté de communes des Hauts Champs, Communauté de communes du Pays des Abbayes, Communauté de communes du Val de Neuné and Communauté de communes Fave, Meurthe, Galilée. On 1 January 2018 it gained 3 communes from the Communauté de communes Bruyères - Vallons des Vosges. It consists of 77 communes, and has its administrative offices at Saint-Dié-des-Vosges. Its area is 979.9 km2. Its population was 74,926 in 2018, of which 19,724 in Saint-Dié-des-Vosges proper.

Composition
The communauté d'agglomération consists of the following 77 communes, of which 74 in the Vosges department and 3 (Bionville, Pierre-Percée and Raon-lès-Leau) in Meurthe-et-Moselle:

Allarmont
Anould
Arrentès-de-Corcieux
Ban-de-Laveline
Ban-de-Sapt
Ban-sur-Meurthe-Clefcy
Barbey-Seroux
Belval
Bertrimoutier
Le Beulay
Biffontaine
Bionville
Bois-de-Champ
La Bourgonce
Celles-sur-Plaine
La Chapelle-devant-Bruyères
Châtas
Coinches
Combrimont
Corcieux
La Croix-aux-Mines
Denipaire
Entre-deux-Eaux
Étival-Clairefontaine
Fraize
Frapelle
Gemaingoutte
Gerbépal
La Grande-Fosse
Grandrupt
La Houssière
Hurbache
Lesseux
Lubine
Lusse
Luvigny
Mandray
Ménil-de-Senones
Le Mont
Mortagne
Moussey
Moyenmoutier
Nayemont-les-Fosses
Neuvillers-sur-Fave
Nompatelize
Pair-et-Grandrupt
La Petite-Fosse
La Petite-Raon
Pierre-Percée
Plainfaing
Les Poulières
Provenchères-et-Colroy
Le Puid
Raon-lès-Leau
Raon-l'Étape
Raon-sur-Plaine
Raves
Remomeix
Les Rouges-Eaux
Saint-Dié-des-Vosges
Sainte-Marguerite
Saint-Jean-d'Ormont
Saint-Léonard
Saint-Michel-sur-Meurthe
Saint-Remy
Saint-Stail
La Salle
Le Saulcy
Saulcy-sur-Meurthe
Senones
Taintrux
Le Vermont
Vexaincourt
Vienville
Vieux-Moulin
La Voivre
Wisembach

References

Saint-Die-des-Vosges
Saint-Die-des-Vosges
Saint-Die-des-Vosges
States and territories established in 2017